Lithuanian Theater, Music and Cinema Museum is a museum in Vilnius, Lithuania. It is located in the Minor Radvilos Palace. The material stored in the Museum reflects life, creation, and spiritual experience of Lithuanian artists. The Museum accumulates, preserves and examines showpieces related to the history of Lithuanian theatre, music, and cinema, organize evenings in commemoration of artists of these spheres, and exhibitions of collections, conducts exhaustive topical excursions and educational programs, prepare educational publications and consult visitors. Communicating with foreign institutions, international exhibitions are also held there to present significant artists of foreign countries. Furthermore, modern art exhibitions are held there, and summers are especially rich with various events in the amphitheatre of the Museum.

References

Music museums
Cinema museums
Museums in Lithuania
Museums in Vilnius